Sandra Cecchini won in the final 7–5, 6–4 against Nathalie Tauziat.

Seeds
A champion seed is indicated in bold text while text in italics indicates the round in which that seed was eliminated.

 n/a
  Sandra Cecchini (champion)
  Pascale Paradis (first round)
  Bettina Fulco (semifinals)
  Judith Wiesner (first round)
  Nathalie Tauziat (final)
  Patricia Tarabini (quarterfinals)
  Barbara Paulus (quarterfinals)

Draw

External links
 1988 WTA Nice Open draw

WTA Nice Open
1988 WTA Tour